Zakącie  is a village in the administrative district of Gmina Garwolin, within Garwolin County, Masovian Voivodeship, in east-central Poland.

Climate 

Zakącie has a warm-summer humid continental climate (Dfb) Köppen Climate Type.

References

Villages in Garwolin County